Hassan's Optician Co. is a retail/wholesale company of eyewear, hearing aid and jewellery primarily based in Kuwait with branches in Oman, Lebanon, UK and Dubai.

History

Hassan's was the first optician store  officially approved by the Kuwaiti Department of Health in 1960. The Company was founded by Dr. Hassan Saadat Yazdi originally from Tehran, Iran; He came during the pre-independence of Kuwait and established Hassan's Optician Co. at Sharq, Kuwait in 1951. His son Kian Saadat Yazdi is currently the chief executive officer (CEO) of the company.

Carl Zeiss AG a German manufacturer of optical systems, went into partnership with Hassan's to open a laboratory in Amghara, Kuwait in 2007

In 2009 Hassan's was honoured with a medal by the Italian Ambassador Enrico Granara on the National Day of Italy for their contribution to the optical industry of Italy. Hassan's was bestowed with the Italian Star of Solidarity.

In 2010 Sanaz Mahingostar (Wife of Kian Saadat) joined Hassan's and founded Eye Boutique.

In 2013 Hassan's was granted the ISO 9001:2008 quality certification. and on 18 April the same year at Pavilion Downtown, Dubai, Hassan's announced a joint venture agreement with Yateem Group.

References

External links 
 hassans.com
 eyeboutiqueme.com

Retail companies established in 1951
Retail companies of Kuwait
Eyewear retailers of Kuwait
Eyewear companies of Kuwait
1951 establishments in Kuwait